Museum of Islamic Art may refer to:
 Museum of Islamic Art, Berlin, Germany
 Museum of Islamic Art, Cairo, Egypt
 Museum of Islamic Art, Doha, Qatar
 Museum of Islamic Art, Ghazni, Afghanistan
 Museum of Islamic Art, Palermo, Italy, located in Zisa Castle
 Museum of Islamic Art, Raqqada in Kairouan, Tunisia

See also
 Islamic Arts Museum Malaysia, Kuala Lumpur
 Islamic Museum, Jerusalem
 Museum for Islamic Art, Jerusalem, formerly L.A. Mayer Institute for Islamic Art, Israel
 Museum of Islamic Ceramics, Cairo, Egypt
 The David Collection, Copenhagen, Denmark
 Topkapi Palace, Istanbul, Turkey